Taqi Mubarak Al-Siyabi commonly known as Taqi Mubarak (born 20 August 1978) is an Omani  footballer who plays for Muscat Club. He represented the national team in 2002 FIFA World Cup qualification matches.

International career
Taqi was part of the first team squad of the Oman national football team till 2002. He was selected for the national team for the first time in 1996. He has made fourteen appearances in the 2002 FIFA World Cup qualification.

References

External links

Taqi Mubarak Al-Siyabi - GOALZZ.com
Taqi Mubarak Al-Siyabi - KOOORA.com

1978 births
Living people
Omani footballers
Oman international footballers
Association football midfielders
Muscat Club players
Footballers at the 1998 Asian Games
Footballers at the 2002 Asian Games
Asian Games competitors for Oman